Lorenzo Moore (1744–1798) was a British Cavalry officer and a Member of the Irish Parliament for the constituency of Dungannon.

Biography
Lorenzo Moore, was born in  1744 in County Wexford  was probably the son of William Moore (born 1716) and Frances (née Hodson) of (Tinraheen near Wexford, Ireland).

In 1774 Moore was in a captain in the 3rd Regiment of Horse. Moore became MP for Dungannon, County Tyrone, and probably resided in Merrion Square in Dublin.

In 1784 Lorenzo succeeded General Henry Seymour Conway as Colonel of the Battle Axe Guards of Dublin Castle.

Family

On 1 October 1774 at St Anne's Church, Soho in London, Moore married Henrietta (died 29 July 1840 Twickenham, aged 87), daughter of Sir Stephen Janssen, 4th Baronet and Catherine, daughter of Colonel Soulégre of Antigua. They had three daughters and a son: 
 Henrietta Catherine (baptised 12 September 1776)
 Williamza Caroline Mary, on 13 June 1823 married John Robert Budgen (1791-1866) eldest son of Thomas of Ballindoney, Ireland.
 Charles William Soulégre (baptised  30 April 1786)

Notes

References
 cites:
Burke’s Genealogical and Heraldic History of the Landed Gentry, 1838
Burke, Sir Bernard Genealogical and Heraldic Dictionary p. 175.
Henry  Farrar's,  Walker’s Hibernian magazine 1771 to 1812  London; 1890

1744 births
1798 deaths
Members of the Parliament of Ireland (pre-1801) for County Tyrone constituencies
Irish MPs 1783–1790